Naganagani (Compagnie Nationale Naganagani) was a state-owned airline based in Burkina Faso. It was formed in 1984 to operate the cargo plane the Boeing 707-336C (XT-ABX). Next  Boeing 707-328C (XT-BBF) was purchased in 1989 for President.

Code data
ICAO Code: BFN

References

Defunct airlines of Burkina Faso
Airlines established in 1984
1984 establishments in Burkina Faso